The San Diego Seals are a box lacrosse team in the National Lacrosse League. They play their home games at the Pechanga Arena in San Diego, California. The 2018-2019 season was their inaugural season.

History
On August 30, 2017, the NLL awarded an expansion franchise to the city of San Diego and owner Joseph Tsai, co-founder of the Chinese e-commerce platform Alibaba Group. Tsai, a La Jolla resident, "played lacrosse at Yale University and retains a passion for the sport." The franchise fee for San Diego and fellow expansion team Philadelphia Wings was a reported $5 million.

On October 24, 2017, the name of the franchise was revealed as the San Diego Seals.

Current roster

All-time record

Playoff results

Awards and honors

Draft history

NLL Entry Draft 
First Round Selections

 2018: Austin Staats (1st overall), Connor Fields (10th overall), Connor Kearnan (11th overall) 
 2019: None
 2020: Tre Leclaire (4th overall), Mac O'Keefe (15th overall) 
 2021: Mike McCannell (5th overall), Patrick Shoemay (9th overall), Jacob Dunbar (13th overall)

Head coaching history

References

External links
 Official Website

 
National Lacrosse League teams
Sports teams in San Diego
Lacrosse clubs established in 2017
2017 establishments in California
Lacrosse teams in California